Brit Awards 2001  was the 21st edition of the annual pop music Brit Awards awards ceremony in the United Kingdom. They are run by the British Phonographic Industry and took place on 26 February 2001 at Earls Court in London.

Performances

Winners and nominees

Outstanding Contribution to Music
 U2

List of British Newcomer shortlist

British Dance Newcomer
 Artful Dodger (Runner-up)
 Chicane
 Oxide & Neutrino
 Shaft
 Sonique

British Pop Newcomer
 A1 (Runner-up)
 Atomic Kitten
 Lolly
 Point Break
 Richard Blackwood

British Rock Newcomer
 Badly Drawn Boy
 Coldplay (Runner-up)
 Death in Vegas
 Muse
 Toploader (Runner-up)

British Urban Newcomer
 Architechs
 Craig David (Runner-up)
 DJ Luck & MC Neat
 M. J. Cole
 Sweet Female Attitude

Multiple nominations and awards

Notable moments

Noel Gallagher and A1
During the ceremony, boy band A1 picked up the 'Award for Best Newcomer'. At the end of the night, Oasis Guitarist Noel Gallagher walked onto stage to present U2 with their 'Award for Outstanding Contribution to Music'. As Gallagher took the microphone at the start of his presenting speech, he said "This award ceremony over the years has been accused of not having a sense of humour, but when you see A1 winning best newcomer, you know that someone's taking the piss somewhere". A1 were apparently offended, and in April 2001 they performed a cover version of the Oasis song "Don't Look Back in Anger" in a mocking way, live using instruments, and not a backing track, as Gallagher had also called the band "manufactured".

References

External links
Brit Awards 2001 at Brits.co.uk

Brit Awards
Brit Awards, 2001
Brit Awards, 2001
Brit Awards
Brit
Brit Awards